Dennis Wirgowski (September 20, 1947 – January 25, 2014) was an American football player who played defensive end.  He played high school football at Bay City High School and  college football at Purdue University. He played professionally in the National Football League for the Boston Patriots (later the New England Patriots) and the 
Philadelphia Eagles. Dennis was diagnosed with Stage 2-3 Chronic Traumatic Encephalopathy at the VA-BU-CLF Brain Bank.

References

1947 births
2014 deaths
American football defensive ends
Boston Patriots players
New England Patriots players
Philadelphia Eagles players
Purdue Boilermakers football players
Sportspeople from Bay City, Michigan
Players of American football from Michigan